The Duquesne Dukes represent Duquesne University in college basketball. The team, which started in 1914, has only ever played in NCAA Division I and has had five appearances in the NCAA Tournament. The Dukes play in the Atlantic 10 Conference, of which they have been members since 1976 (minus the 1992–93 season in which the Dukes were single-season members of the Midwestern Collegiate Conference). As of January 7, 2020, the head basketball coach is Keith Dambrot.

The Dukes men's basketball team has had great success over the years, playing twice in national championship games in the 1950s and winning the National Invitation Tournament championship in 1955. Duquesne also emerged victorious in the 1976–77 Eastern Collegiate Basketball League championship (the forerunner to the Eastern Athletic Association, now known as the Atlantic 10 Conference) and 1979–80 and 1980–81 Eastern Athletic Association regular season co-championships. The Associated Press ranked Duquesne as the No. 1 college basketball team in the country for two consecutive weeks during the 1953–54 season.

Duquesne is the only school to have back-to-back first overall picks in the National Basketball Association Draft (Dick Ricketts by the Saint Louis Hawks in 1955 and Sihugo Green by the Rochester Royals in 1956). The Dukes men's basketball program can also claim the first African-American player selected in an NBA draft (Chuck Cooper by the Boston Celtics in 1950). The 1939–40 Dukes basketball team finished with a 20–3 record and appeared in the Final Four of both the NIT and NCAA Tournaments. Duquesne has had the most Atlantic 10 scoring champions in conference history.

History

Early history
The history of basketball at Duquesne University can be dated back to 1914, when the university administration established basketball as a varsity sport. The first game, against Bethany College, was won in a gym under the college chapel on January 9, 1914 (Rishel 23). The team was first coached by Alexander Hogarty, whose tenure lasted only one season. The position was filled by Father Eugene McGuigan, who was called "Father Mac" on campus and "Coach Gene Martin" in newspaper reports in order to prevent the name of a Holy Ghost father from being associated with the rowdiness of "Basket-ball". Father McGuigan coached football, baseball, and basketball until he was transferred from Duquesne University in 1923 (Rishel 38).

When a proper gymnasium was constructed in 1923, Duquesne Basketball was finally allowed to come into its own, as the previous court was in reality a stage below the chapel and was not only slanted but demarcated by a steel cage on its perimeter. Teams had previously refused to play the "Bluffites" on their home court. Coach "Chick" Davies initiated a new era in the basketball program, filling the 1,200-seat gymnasium and bringing the team into national prominence. In its first season with Davies, Duquesne tied with Waynesburg University for the Tri-State Conference championship and dominated the same conference in 1926 and 1927 before moving to a higher level of competition. The season expanded from 20 to 28 games and became more competitive in 1930 when the team faced the University of Iowa, Loyola University Chicago, Adrian College, Elmhurst College, Alfred State College, John Carroll University, American University, Catholic University, Colgate University, St. Bonaventure University, Seton Hall University, Manhattan College, and the City College of New York. Davies, immensely popular, coached Duquesne basketball until 1948 (Rishel 40–41).

World War II era
The university tried to hold on to basketball during World War II, having reworked the gymnasium in 1942 to seat an extra 800 spectators, but was forced to drop the sport at the end of the 1943 season (Rishel 81–82). However, the sport was reinstated in the spring of 1946. During the 1946–1947 season Davies led the Dukes to 19 straight victories before a loss to Georgetown University. In that same season, Duquesne received its third invitation to the NIT, losing by one point to the University of Utah, the eventual champion, which it had defeated during the regular season (Rishel 101).

During this first postwar season, the University of Tennessee refused to play a scheduled game against Duquesne at the McKeesport (PA) Vocational High School because the Dukes had a black player--Chuck Cooper. The December 23, 1946, game had been highly anticipated since Tennessee had two All-Americans and four other returning lettermen. As Davies refused to remove Cooper from the squad, Tennessee canceled at the last minute. In 1950, Cooper became the first African-American drafted to play professional basketball when he joined the Boston Celtics (Rishel 101).

Mid-century success
Dukes Basketball continued to impress with a new coach in the 1949 season--Donald "Dudey" Moore. Moore's team achieved a 17–5 record in the 1949 season, and in 1950, 23 wins and another bid to the NIT. By the 1950s, Duquesne's Locust Street gym had become inadequate to seat the team's spectators, so games were usually played in a high school gym in McKeesport or the Duquesne Gardens in Oakland. Even at this point, daily practice was held at North Catholic High School (Rishel 102).

The 1950s marked an age of immense success for Dukes Basketball, with Moore leading his team to six NIT bids, during which time Moore was named "United Press Coach of the Year" and achieved a school-record 21–1 season (1951–52). In 1953, Duquesne was rated as a preseason "best in the East" and possibly the nation. With a 23–2 record, they were top seed for the NIT that year. Although they lost to the College of the Holy Cross, they achieved a new record of 26 victories in a season. Top-seeded again in '54, Duquesne, following a 19–4 regular season, finally won the title of NIT Champions in 1955 (Rishel 137–138).

The 1956 season almost came to an early end, as the Duquesne Gardens, then Duquesne's home court, was to be demolished. However, in a gesture which athletic director Doc Skender called "one of the finest acts of sportsmanship I've ever known," long-standing rival the University of Pittsburgh allowed the Dukes use of the Fitzgerald Field House for home games (Rishel 138).

Coach Red Manning, initially unpopular, soon led the Dukes to another era of NIT invitations, ending up in the Final Four in the '61–62 season, the Elite Eight in '63–64, and four more bids between 1967 and the 1970–71 season.

Notable in this decade was Willie Somerset, nicknamed by the press as "Wonderful Willie." Though only 5'11", he could jump higher than any other player on the team (Rishel 177).

1970s to 1990s

The 1970s saw the end of Manning's tenure. Duquesne had seen only four different basketball coaches in fifty years, but this decade alone saw three coaches: Manning, John Cinicola, and Mike Rice. The decade was relatively lackluster, although it saw the likes of "the greatest guard in Duquesne basketball history"--Norm Nixon (Rishel 216). The 1980s were marked by problems with many players' academic eligibility—calling into question the university's recruiting and support procedures—and are best described as "trying times" for the Dukes (Rishel 246). There were only two winning seasons in the decade--'80–81 and '85–86. Even so, the 1988 construction of the A. J. Palumbo Center—Duquesne Basketball's current home—is a notable event of this time period.

21st century
The Dukes have struggled in the 21st century, reaching only one NIT tournament (eliminated in the first round) and two College Basketball Invitational tournaments (only once making it to the second round). Despite coming off a second straight winning season, coach Ron Everhart was fired after the 2011–2012 season; the university cited a lack of postseason success as the main reason for the firing.

Postseason

NCAA tournament results
The Dukes have appeared in the NCAA Tournament five times. Their combined record is 4–5.

NIT results
The Dukes have appeared in the National Invitation Tournament (NIT) 17 times. Their combined record is 17–19. They were NIT champions in 1955.

CBI results
The Dukes have appeared in the College Basketball Invitational (CBI) four times. Their combined record is 2–4.

National Campus Basketball Tournament results
The Dukes appeared in the only National Campus Basketball Tournament. Their record is 0–1.

Retired numbers 

On January 27, 2001, during the halftime of a game against Xavier University (Cincinnati), the Duquesne University Department of Athletics retired the jersey numbers of five of its all-time greatest players: Chuck Cooper, Sihugo Green, Norm Nixon, Dick Ricketts and Willie Somerset. Mike James' number 13 was retired in 2017.

All-time coaches

Notable players
All-Americans
1935 – Paul Birch
1936 – Herb Bonn, Walter Miller
1940 – Ed Milkovich, Paul Widowitz
1941 – Moe Becker, Paul Widowitz
1950 – Chuck Cooper
1952 – Jim Tucker
1953 – Dick Ricketts
1954 – Sihugo Green, Dick Ricketts
1955 – Sihugo Green, Dick Ricketts
1956 – Sihugo Green
1965 – Willie Somerset
1973 – Norm Nixon
1990 – Derrick Alston

Professional

 Shawn James (born 1983), Guyanese-American basketball player

References

External links